Gosse is a surname. Notable people with the surname include:

 Bob Gosse (born 1963), American film producer and director
 Charles Gosse (1849–1885), Australian surgeon, son of William
 Clarence Gosse (1912–1996), Canadian physician and Lieutenant Governor of Nova Scotia
 Edmund Gosse (1849–1928), English poet, author and critic, son of Philip
 Emily Bowes Gosse (1806–1857), English painter and illustrator
 George Gosse (1912–1964), Australian landmine clearance specialist
 Gordie Gosse (1955–2019), Canadian politician
 James Hay Gosse (1876–1952), Australian businessman, sportsman, and zoo director
 John Gosse, Canadian geologist
 Nicolas Gosse (1787-1878), French historical painter
 Peter Gosse (born 1938), German poet, prose author and essayist
 Philip Henry Gosse (1810–1888), English naturalist, author of Omphalos: An Attempt to Untie the Geological Knot
 Sylvia Gosse (1881–1968, born Laura Gosse), English painter and engraver, daughter of Edmund
 William Gosse (disambiguation), several people:
 William Gosse (explorer) (William Christie Gosse)
 William Gosse (surgeon), British Australian doctor
 William Gosse (MP) for Bridgwater (UK Parliament constituency)
 William Gosse Hay, brother-in-law and nephew of William Christie Gosse

See also
 Gosses Bluff, impact crater in the southern Northern Territory, Australia
 Gosse Ludigman (elected 989, died 1000), the sixth elected governor of Friesland
 Saint-Laurent-de-Gosse, commune in the Landes department in Aquitaine, France
 Sainte-Marie-de-Gosse, communes in the Landes department in Aquitaine, France
 Gosse, South Australia, a locality